Juan de Dios Jurado (born 9 April 1981) is a Spanish middle-distance runner who specializes in the 800 metres.

He finished third at the 2005 European Indoor Athletics Championships in Madrid and fifth at the 2006 IAAF World Indoor Championships in Moscow, the latter in an indoor personal best time of 1:47.38 minutes.

His personal best time over 800 m is 1:45.42 min, achieved in June 2006 in Huelva.

External links

1981 births
Living people
Spanish male middle-distance runners
Place of birth missing (living people)